Ryan Moore (born October 8, 1983) is an American stock car racing driver who currently races super late models in the Southern United States. He previously competed in NASCAR, winning the 2003 Busch North Series Rookie of the Year award and winning two races and three poles en route to a career-best 5th-place points finish in 2005. He then made a total of 15 starts in the Busch Series and Craftsman Truck Series between 2005 and 2006.

Racing career

2005
Moore had his best season in the Busch North Series in 2005, winning two races and three poles, along with posting career highs in top fives (8) and top tens (10) en route to a 5th-place points finish. His victory at Lake Erie Speedway was a wire-to-wire victory, as Moore led all 150 laps from the pole in that race.

He also made his Busch Series debut, driving the No. 81 Oreo/Kraft Foods Chevrolet Monte Carlo for Dale Earnhardt, Inc. He made his debut at New Hampshire International Speedway, and had his best finish at Homestead-Miami Speedway, where he finished 13th.

Moore and team owner Dale Earnhardt Jr. reportedly had a falling out following the 2005 season, and would part ways before the next season.

2006
In 2006, Moore went to race in the Craftsman Truck Series for Key Motorsports, making 11 starts and posting two top 15 finishes.

He also made one Busch Series start in 2006 at Phoenix International Raceway for Braun-Akins Racing, where he finished 29th.

Personal life
Moore's father is fellow race car driver Kelly Moore, who is the all-time wins leader in K&N Pro Series East history. Currently he is working for his father at their trucking company R.C MOORE INC,, out of the Troutman, NC terminal.

Motorsports career results

NASCAR
(key) (Bold – Pole position awarded by qualifying time. Italics – Pole position earned by points standings or practice time. * – Most laps led.)

Busch Series

Craftsman Truck Series Series

Busch East Series

West Series

References

External links
 

1983 births
Living people
NASCAR drivers
People from Scarborough, Maine
Racing drivers from Maine
USAC Silver Crown Series drivers